The 2012 Puskás Cup was the fifth edition of the Puskás Cup and took place 6 April to 8 April. Budapest Honvéd FC were the defending champions and they won their third title by defeating Puskás Akadémia 7–0 in the final.

Participating teams
 Austria Wien (invited)
 Budapest Honvéd (former club of Ferenc Puskás)
 Hagi Football Academy (invited)
 Panathinaikos (former club of Ferenc Puskás)
 Puskás Academy (host)
 Real Madrid (former club of Ferenc Puskás)

Squads

Puskás
 RÁCZ Tamás goalkeeper 1995. 03. 28.
 WITTNER Máté goalkeeper 1995. 06. 07.
 BAKSA Dénes defender 1995. 02. 17.
 DOBSA Gergő defender 1995. 04. 21.
 KIRÁLY Bence defender 1995. 02. 20.
 LORENTZ Márton defender 1995. 02. 01.
 SPANDLER Csaba defender 1996. 03. 07.
 BÜKI Baltazár midfielder 1995. 02. 19.
 FÉNYES Szabolcs midfielder 1995. 04. 30.
 ILLÉS Gábor midfielder 1995. 05. 22.
 OLDAL Tibor midfielder 1995. 01. 26.
 SZELEI Donát midfielder 1995. 10. 10.
 TÓTH Márk midfielder 1995. 07. 16.
 VALLEJOS Dominique midfielder 1995. 10. 22.
 ZSÓTÉR Donát midfielder 1996. 01. 06.
 MOLNÁR Máté forward 1995. 03. 24.
 NÉMETH Erik forward 1996. 02. 07.
 TÓTH László forward 1995. 07. 09.
 VINCZE Viktor forward 1995. 09. 09.

Panathinaikos
 Nestoras GEKAS goalkeeper 1995. 03. 07.
 Konstantinos KOTSARIS goalkeeper 1996. 07. 25.
 Panagiotis ARNAOUTO GLOUMÁLAGA defender 1996. 05. 30.
 Adam ELGAMAL defender 1995. 06. 26.
 Efstathitos NIKIFOROS defender 1995. 08. 05.
 Andreas PLESSAS defender 1996. 06. 10.
 Marios TZANOULINOS defender 1996. 04. 15.
 Alexandros VOSDOU defender 1995. 01. 16.
 Dimitrios MIRTHIANOS defender 1995. 08. 13.
 David GIZGIZIAN midfielder 1995. 07. 08.
 Nikolaos KRASONIS midfielder 1995. 01. 25.
 Dimitrios NTAGRAS midfielder 1995. 09. 04.
Mario BAMICHA midfielder 1996. 07. 03.
 Michal-Peter NEWMAN midfielder 1996. 06. 20.
 Panagiotis STAIKOS midfielder 1996. 02. 08.
 Maldin YMERAI midfielder 1995. 03. 06.
 Anastasios DONIS forward 1996. 08. 29.
 Lampros THANAILAKIS forward 1995. 12. 17.

Venues
Felcsút

Results
All times are local (UTC+2).

Group A

Group B

Fifth place play-off

Third place play-off

Final

References

External links
Official website

2010
2011–12 in Spanish football
2011–12 in Hungarian football
2011–12 in Greek football
2011–12 in Romanian football
2011–12 in Austrian football